Bratsberg Church is a parish church of the Church of Norway in Trondheim municipality in Trøndelag county, Norway. It is located in the Bratsberg area southeast of the city of Trondheim and east of Heimdal. It is one of the churches for the Nidelven parish which is part of the Strinda prosti (deanery) in the Diocese of Nidaros. The white, wooden church was built in a cruciform style in 1850 by Ole Henriksen using plans drawn up by the architect Hans Linstow. The church seats about 220 people.

History
The earliest existing historical records of the church date back to the year 1663, but the church was founded much earlier. The old medieval church was torn down around the year 1663. In its place, a new church was constructed on the same site. The new church had a rather unique Y-shaped floor plan.

By 1845, the old church was in poor condition and it was decided to replace the old church. The new church was built in 1850 by a team led by Ole Henriksen using designs that were drawn up by Hans Linstow. The church was consecrated on 4 December 1850 by Hans Jørgen Darre who was the Bishop of the Diocese of Nidaros. The new church had a cruciform design. The church underwent restoration during 1905, 1972, and 2016.

The original altarpiece was performed at that time by Eilert Balle Lund (1815–1891). The present altarpiece dates to 1972 and was completed by Knut Skinnarland (1909–1993). The baptismal font is in brass and dates from 1638. The organ was installed in 1913. The church has two bells dating from 1850 and 1989.

See also
List of churches in Nidaros

Media gallery

References

Churches in Trondheim
Churches in Trøndelag
Cruciform churches in Norway
Wooden churches in Norway
19th-century Church of Norway church buildings
Churches completed in 1850
14th-century establishments in Norway